Bagh-e Sheykh Musa (also Romanized as Bāgh-e Sheykh Mūsá) is a village in Sheykh Musa Rural District, in the Central District of Aqqala County, Golestan Province, Iran. At the 2006 census, its population was 346, in 77 families.

References 

Populated places in Aqqala County